Ashok Desai, b. 1936, is an Indian economist.

He graduated from Sydenham College, Bombay University, with a BCom, proceeded to King's College, Cambridge for a BA in Economics where Nicholas Kaldor was his supervisor; his student contemporaries included Jagdish Bhagwati and Manmohan Singh.

He received the PhD in Economics of Cambridge University in 1963 for a thesis on German economic growth before World War I, titled "Real Wages in Germany 1871–1913", done under supervision of Phyllis Deane.

He has been a noted economic journalist and private business consultant in India, and was also Chief Consultant in the Indian Ministry of Finance in 1991–1993 under Manmohan Singh's ministership.

References

External links

20th-century Indian economists
1936 births
Living people